Daniel Musiol (born March 27, 1983 in Cottbus) is a German former professional cyclist.

Major results
2001
1st  Team pursuit, National Junior Track Championships
2003
1st Stage 8 Tour de Guadeloupe
2007
5th Omloop van de Vlaamse Scheldeboorden
6th Rund um die Nürnberger Altstadt
9th Scheldeprijs
2008
7th Sparkassen Münsterland Giro
9th Scheldeprijs

References

External links

1983 births
Living people
German male cyclists
Sportspeople from Cottbus
Cyclists from Brandenburg
21st-century German people